This article lists songs about Houston, Texas set there, or named after a location or feature of the city.

It is not intended to include songs where Houston is simply "name-checked" along with various other cities (e.g., "London speed it up, Houston rock it", from Beyoncé's song Countdown).

0-9
 "713" by The Carters

B
 “Back To Houston” by Jeremy Castle
 Bloody Mary Morning by Willie Nelson
 "Bow Down (Homecoming Live)" by Beyoncé

C
 "City of the Swang" by Bun B featuring Slim Thug and Mike Jones

D
 "Dallas to Houston" by SPM
 "Dracula from Houston" by Butthole Surfers
 "Desires" by Drake and Future

F
 "Fannin Street" by Tom Waits
 "Flawless" by Beyoncé
 "Football Time in Houston" by Clay Walker

H
 "H-Town" by Dizzie Rascal
 "H-Town" by Nipsey Hussle
 "H-Town" by Short Dawg featuring Propain and Z-Ro
 "Heaven, Hell or Houston" by ZZ Top
 "Hello Houston" by Keith Wallen
 "Hello Houston" by The Starting Line
 “Hip-hop Saved My Life by Lupe Fiasco
 "Hollyweezy" by Lil Wayne
 "Home To Houston" by Steve Earle
 "Houstatlantavegas" by Drake
 "Houston, I’m Coming To See You” by Glen Campbell
 "Houston" by Aaron Watson
 “Houston” by Chevy Woods
 "Houston" by Dean Martin
 "Houston" by Kaos, Karl, and Jae Kennedy
 "Houston" by Mary Chapin Carpenter
 "Houston" by Oddisse
 Houston by R.E.M.
 "Houston by Soul Coughing
 "Houston" by Stephen Ashbrook
 "Houston Bound" by Lightnin Hopkins
 "Houston is Hot Tonight" by Iggy Pop
 "Houston (Means I'm One Day Closer to You)" by Larry Gatlin
 "Houston Old Head" by A$ap Rocky
 "Houston, the Action Town" by Juke Boy Bonner
 "Houston Solution" by Ronnie Milsap
 "Houston #1" by Coldplay 2017 (for the flooding)
 "Houstonfornication" by Travis Scott
 "Hustle Town by SPM
 "Houston" by The Hates

I
 "I Been On" by Beyoncé
 "If You Ever Get to Houston (Look Me Down) by Don Gibson
 "If You Ever Go to Houston" by Bob Dylan
 "Imagine Houston" by Joe Ely

L
 “Letter from Houston” by Rod Wave
 "Living on the Edge (of Houston) by Reverend Horton Heat
 "Lord Only Knows" by Beck

M
 "Midnight Special by Lead Belly
 "My Block by Scarface

N
 "Night Flight from Houston" by Laurie Anderson

P
 "Purple Swag" by A$ap Rocky

R
 "Rainy Day in Houston" by Lightnin' Hopkins
 "Rothko Chapel" by David Dondero
 "Run the World (Girls)" by Beyoncé

S
 "Say Ho" by Scott Miller
 "Space City" by Baby Bash
 "Still Tippin' by Mike Jones featuring Slim Thug and Paul Wall
 “Swangin’ On Westheimer” by Don Toliver
 "Sweet" by Brockhampton

T
 "Telephone Road" by Steve Earle
 "Telephone Road" by Rodney Crowell
 "They Don't Know" by Paul Wall featuring Bun B and Mike Jones
 "Tighten Up by Archie Bell & the Drells
 “Tirando la H” by Esteban Gabriel
 “TSU” by Drake

W
 "Welcome 2 Houston" by Slim Thug featuring Chamillionaire, Mike Jones, UGK, Paul Wall, Yung Redd, Lil Keke, Z-Ro, Rob G, Lil' O, Big Pockey, and Mike D
 Welcome to H-Town by Lecrae
 "White Freightliner Blues" by Townes Van Zandt

References

Houston
 Houston
Culture of Houston
Songs